Betty Spaghetty was a bendable rubber doll from the Ohio Art Company. She is portrayed as a fun-loving teenager or preteen. She has two best friends named Zoe and Hannah and a younger sister. Her features include rubbery hair used to let children make different hairstyles and changeable hands, feet, shoes, etc. The doll was targeted at girls ages 4 and up. Some models came with accessories, such as a cell phone, a laptop computer, and in-line skates.

Betty Spaghetty was invented and designed by Elonne Dantzer and licensed to The Ohio Art Co. and released in 1998. The doll was very popular during its launch, however the line was discontinued in 2004 due to Ohio Art's toy shipments falling to 15% due to weak retail markets and strong competition in the fashion doll market. But in 2007, Ohio Art announced that the dolls would return with a new look. The new Betty Spaghetty dolls were released later that year, but were discontinued a second time a year later due to lackluster sales. Moose Toys revealed at the 2016 Toy Fair that Betty Spaghetty would be sold as part of their brand in the fall of 2016.

Lines

Betty Spaghetty "Around the World" Sets 
 Betty Tours London - Lucy and Betty  
 Betty In Paris - Betty and Nikki
 Betty In Australia - Tess and Betty 
 Betty's On Broadway - Olivia and Betty 
 Betty Goes To Hollywood - Mandy and Betty 
 Around the World Travel Set

Other Sets 
 Slumber Party - Zoe, Betty, and Hannah
 Campfire Fun n' Friends! - Zoe and Celeste 
 Go For The Goal! Kristyn
 Hittin' The Slopes! - Betty and Zoe 
 Schoolin' Around - Betty and Haley 
 Makin' The Scene - Betty, Zoe, and Hannah 
 Horsin' Around - Betty and her horse, Dakota 
 School Daze - Betty and Hannah 
 Solar Ace In Space - Betty and Solar Eclipse 
 Glo Crazy! - Betty 
 Fun at the Beach - Betty and Zoe 
 Shop 'til you Drop - Zoe, Betty, and Hannah
 Ready to Party Backpack - Betty and Zoe
 Fancy Party - Betty and Zoe 
 Betty Spaghetty's Birthday
 Hannah's Birthday
 Zoe's Birthday
 Betty's Closet
 Zoe's Closet
 Hannah's Closet
 Betty's Beauty Bag
 Designer Girl book with Doll
 Mall Makeover Madness - Betty and Hannah
 Cats Rule! - Zoe and Chloe
 Dog's Rock! - Betty and Jill
 Betty's Bike - Betty and Jack

Betty Spaghetty DOO's 
 Betty's Spaghetty DOO's
 Zoe's Spaghetty DOO's
 Hannah's Spaghetty DOO's

Sibling Sets 
 Big Brother Little Brother - Adam and Josh
 My Little Sis Learn to Skate - Ally and Betty  
 My Little Sis Learn to Skate - Emily and Hannah
 My Little Sis Tea Party - Ally and Betty 
 My Little Sis Tea Party - Emily and Hannah
 My Baby Sis Oh, Baby! - Katy and Betty

Makin' A Splash 
 Makin' A Splash - Rebecca 
 Makin' A Splash - Zoe
 Makin' A Splash - Hannah

Influence
Betty Spaghetty may have been the influence for the antagonist of the horror video game Poppy Playtime: Chapter 2, Mommy Long Legs. Like Betty Spaghetty, Mommy Long Legs has extendable and bendable arms.

References

4. United States Copyright Office, Registered copyrights #VAu000716974/2006-0823, BETTY SPAGHETTY DOLL

Doll brands
1990s toys
2000s toys
2010s toys
Products introduced in 1998